Ember Oakley (born ) is an American attorney and politician serving as a member of the Wyoming House of Representatives from the 55th district. Elected in November 2020, she assumed office on January 4, 2021.

Early life and education 
Oakley was born in Rawlins, Wyoming. She earned a Bachelor of Science degree in agribusiness from Texas A&M University and a Juris Doctor from the University of Wyoming College of Law.

Career 
Since 2011, Oakley has worked as a prosecutor for the Fremont County, Wyoming Attorney's Office. She was narrowly elected to the Wyoming House of Representatives in November 2020, defeating Libertarian candidate Bethany Baldes. She assumed office on January 4, 2021.

References

External links

Living people
People from Rawlins, Wyoming
Texas A&M University alumni
University of Wyoming College of Law alumni
Wyoming lawyers
Republican Party members of the Wyoming House of Representatives
Women state legislators in Wyoming
21st-century American politicians
21st-century American women politicians
Year of birth missing (living people)